Phi Andromedae (φ  Andromedae, φ And) is the Bayer designation for a binary star system near the border of the northern constellation of Andromeda. This system has a combined apparent visual magnitude of 4.25 and is visible to the naked eye. With χ And it forms the Chinese asterism 軍南門 (Keun Nan Mun, Mandarin jūnnánmén), "the South Gate of the Camp".

Components 

The 4.46 magnitude primary component is a Be star with a stellar classification of B7 Ve, indicating that it is a B-type main sequence star that shows prominent emission lines of hydrogen in its spectrum. These emission lines come from a flattened decretion disk of hot gas that is orbiting the host star. The star is rotating rapidly with a projected rotational velocity of 75 km/s. The pole of the star is inclined around 20° to the line of sight from the Earth.

The 6.06 magnitude companion star is a B-type main sequence star with a classification of B9 V. On average the two stars are separated by about 0.6 arcseconds and have an orbital period of roughly 554 years. Based upon their orbital elements, the system has a combined mass of around  times the mass of the Sun.

References

External links 
 Image φ Andromedae
 www.astro.uiuc.edu/
 HR 0335
 CCDM J01095+4715AB

Andromedae, Phi
Andromeda (constellation)
Binary stars
B-type main-sequence stars
B-type subgiants
Emission-line stars
Andromedae, 42
006811
005434
0335
BD+46 0275